Hazem Mahamid (born 16 October, in Homs, Syria) is a Syrian footballer. He currently plays for Al-Shorta.

International career
He has been a regular for the Syria national football team since 2009. Senior national coach Fajr Ibrahim called him for the first time, and he debuted in a 5 June 2009 friendly against Sierra Leone. He came on as a substitute for Wael Ayan in the second halftime.

Appearances for Syrian national team
Results list Syria's goal tally first.

W = Matches won; D = Matches drawn; L = Matches lost

1 Non FIFA 'A' international match

External links
 

1987 births
Living people
Sportspeople from Homs
Syrian footballers
Syria international footballers
Syrian expatriate footballers
Expatriate footballers in Iraq
Syrian expatriate sportspeople in Iraq
Association football midfielders
Syrian Premier League players